is a tram stop on the Hiroden Main Line, located in kan'on-machi, Nishi-ku, Hiroshima, Japan.

Routes
From Kanon-machi Station, there are two of Hiroden Streetcar routes.

 Hiroshima Station - Hiroden-miyajima-guchi Route
 Hiroden-nishi-hiroshima - Hiroshima Port Route

Connections
█ Main Line
 
Tenma-cho — Kanon-machi — Nishi-kanon-machi

Around station
Peace Boulevard
Hiroshima-Nishi Post office

History
Opened as "Kanon-machi" in 1926.
Closed in May 1942.
Reopened as "Nishi-Tenma-cho" on September 1, 1964.
Renamed as "Kanon-machi" on April 1, 1965.

See also
Hiroden Streetcar Lines and Routes

References

Kanon-machi Station
Railway stations in Japan opened in 1926